Hysterogonia is a genus of trematodes in the family Opecoelidae.

Species
Hysterogonia balistis Hanson, 1955
Hysterogonia bychowskii Korotaeva, 1972

References

Opecoelidae
Plagiorchiida genera